Melinda Czink was the defending champion, but chose to participate in Budapest instead.

Grace Min won the title, defeating Maria Sanchez in the final, 6–4, 7–6(7–4).

Seeds

Main draw

Finals

Top half

Bottom half

References
 Main Draw*

Audi Melbourne Pro Tennis Classic - Singles